The 2020 My Bariatric Solutions 300 was a NASCAR Xfinity Series race held on July 18, 2020 at Texas Motor Speedway in Fort Worth, Texas. Contested over 201 laps – extended from 200 due to an overtime finish – on the  intermediate quad-oval, it was the 16th race of the 2020 NASCAR Xfinity Series season. Austin Cindric won his third consecutive race after Kyle Busch's car failed post-race inspection.

The race was originally scheduled to be held on March 28, 2020, but was postponed due to the ongoing COVID-19 pandemic.

Report

Background 

Texas Motor Speedway is a speedway located in the northernmost portion of the U.S. city of Fort Worth, Texas – the portion located in Denton County, Texas. The track measures 1.5 miles (2.4 km) around and is banked 24 degrees in the turns, and is of the oval design, where the front straightaway juts outward slightly. The track layout is similar to Atlanta Motor Speedway and Charlotte Motor Speedway (formerly Lowe's Motor Speedway). The track is owned by Speedway Motorsports, Inc., the same company that owns Atlanta and Charlotte Motor Speedways, as well as the short-track Bristol Motor Speedway.

Because of the ongoing COVID-19 pandemic, the race was held without spectators in the grandstands.  However, spectators with backstretch camping were allowed to attend.

Entry list 

 (R) denotes rookie driver.
 (i) denotes driver who is ineligible for series driver points.

Qualifying 
Michael Annett was awarded the pole for the race as determined by a random draw.

Starting Lineup 

 The No. 47 of Kyle Weatherman had to start from the rear due to failing inspection multiple times.

Race

Race results

Stage Results 
Stage One

Laps: 45

Stage Two

Laps: 45

Final Stage Results 
Laps: 110

Race statistics 

 Lead changes: 15 among 7 different drivers
 Cautions/Laps: 9 for 39
 Red flags: 0
 Time of race: 2 hours, 22 minutes, 32 seconds
 Average speed:

Media

Television 
The My Bariatric Solutions 300 was carried by NBCSN in the United States. Rick Allen, Steve Letarte, Jeff Burton, and Dale Earnhardt Jr. called the race from the booth at Charlotte Motor Speedway, with Marty Snider and Dave Burns covering pit road.

Radio 
The Performance Racing Network (PRN) called the race for radio, which was simulcast on SiriusXM NASCAR Radio.

Standings after the race 

 Drivers' Championship standings

 Note: Only the first 12 positions are included for the driver standings.
 . – Driver has clinched a position in the NASCAR playoffs.

Notes

References 

2020 NASCAR Xfinity Series
My Bariatric Solutions 300
NASCAR races at Texas Motor Speedway
My Bariatric Solutions 300
My Bariatric Solutions